Thomson Video Networks (TVN) was a technology broadcast company that used to provide video compression, transcoding and processing solutions for media companies, video service providers, and TV broadcasters. The firm has offices in 16 countries and headquarters in Rennes, France. TVN has been acquired by Harmonic Inc. in 2016.

History 
The company has been established in the video delivery domain since the late 1980s when the Motion Picture Experts Group (MPEG) was created with the purpose of deriving a standard for the coding of moving pictures and audio.  As a video headend division of the French electronics Thomson group, now known as Technicolor SA, the company developed and manufactured MPEG-2 and MPEG-4/AVC video encoding and networking equipment based on advanced compression algorithms. Since 2011, the division has become an independent private held company with a financial structure backed by the public/private Venture Capital, FCDE.

Its products include High Definition (HD) / Standard Definition (SD) broadcast and multi-screen video encoding, decoding, transcoding, multiplexing, redundancy and network management, as well as video stream server for contribution, terrestrial, satellite, cable, IPTV, and OTT services.

The firm participates in the development and definition of the High Efficiency Video Coding (HEVC) compression standard. The HEVC standard aims at obtaining a bit-rate reduction of up to 50 percent compared to the current H.264 compression format, and paves the way for broadcasting in the Ultra high definition television (Ultra HD) picture format. The firm is a member of broadcasting associations such as ATSC, MPEG-DASH Industry Forum, DVB, IABM, MPEG, OMA, SCTE, SMPTE, as well as a founding member of the French Research Institute B-Com.

As of March 2016 Thomson Video Networks has been acquired by Harmonic Inc.

Products 
 ViBE EM series of HD/SD MPEG-2/MPEG-4 AVC Broadcast Encoder 
 ViBE VS7000 Multi-screen & HEVC Encoder & Transcoder
 ViBE CP6000 Contribution Encoder & Decoder
 NetProcessor Video Processing & Multiplexing Platform
 Sapphire Channel In A Box MPEG Stream Server
 Amethyst IP/ASI Redundancy Switch
 XMS Network Management System

References

Technology companies of France
Television companies of France
Networking hardware companies
Broadcast engineering
Privately held companies of France
Multinational companies headquartered in France
Technology companies established in 2011
Technicolor SA
Companies based in Brittany
Rennes